Baihe.com is a Chinese online dating service, founded in 2005, run by the Baihe Network Company. It uses Sesame Credit data as part of its service. In December 2015, Baihe absorbed its largest competitor, jiayuan.com, in a merger.

References

External links
Official Website

2005 establishments in China
Internet properties established in 2005
Online dating services of China